Thiru Thiru Thuru Thuru is a 2009 Indian Tamil-language romantic comedy film written and directed by newcomer Nandhini JS. Starring Ajmal Ameer of Anjathey fame and newcomer Rupa Manjari, the film, produced by Sathyam Cinemas, was released on 25 September 2009. this film was an above average grosser.

Plot
Srinivasan (Mouli) is an owner of Ad-Agency which is going on a loss. To make his company stand up he expects a great project from big company Johnson and Johnson. During a meeting for the project discussion Arjun (Ajmal Ameer) the art executive and a pet of Srinivasan, disappoints the clients with his mischievous behaviour. To convince the clients who are reluctant to give the project to them, Srinivasan produces the ad at his own risk with his own money, on the agreement that the project will be accepted if everything is done perfectly.

The baby who is scheduled to act in the ad gets sick and Arjun and his colleague Archana try to find a new baby, else shooting will be cancelled. Arjun finds a cute baby on the road and asks his mother, who refuses the proposal. While convincing, the mother faces an accident. Arjun admits her in the hospital and meanwhile takes the baby to the client and gets their approval. Arjun returns to hospital to find the mother and found that she left without caring about the baby. Arjun takes the baby to the police station and discusses the issue with police friend. He then takes the baby to his home accompanied by Archana. The ad shooting is finished, but awaits client approval who demands written no objection agreement duly signed by the baby's parents within next three days to avoid future issues, else the project will not approved and money spent will also not be compensated.

Arjun and Archana find that the lady, from whom Arjun took the baby is not his real mother, rather a baby stealer. Both of them set to Pondicherry to search for her to find who the baby's real parents are. They find her finally, but the lady denies their charge of baby stealing. By some non-violent tortures they grab the details of the real parents. The lady stole the baby from the parents and she along with her boyfriend demand twenty lakh rupees from them to return to them and while on the mission she lost the baby to Arjun. The kidnapper diverts them saying that he is the real parent to Arjun and also orders the baby's parents to give them the  money and pick up the kid in a separate remote place. Arjun and Archana arrive there, find something wrong and run away with the baby. Both of them are finally trapped among the kidnappers, parents and the police.

The due date for handing over the agreement finally comes and Srinivasan, unable to catch Arjun finally admits that he could not produce the agreement and therefore he quits from the project, while Arjun and Archana arrive there with the document and finally the project gets approved. Actually Arjun and Archana were misunderstood as kidnappers and caught by police. They explain who they are and show the ad film taken with the baby. The parents are very  happy on getting back their baby and seeing their child in the ad and sign the agreement. Arjun and Archana finally unite and romance each other.

Cast

 Ajmal Ameer as Arjun
 Rupa Manjari as Archana
 T. S. B. K. Moulee as Srinivasan
 Lakshmi Ramakrishnan as Kavitha Sreenivasan
 Yog Japee as John
 D. R. K. Kiran as SI Deva
 Lollu Sabha Balaji
 T. M. Karthik
 Baby Darshan as Gayathri Mahesh
 Narendra as Kumar
 Aravind as Mahesh
 Deepa Narendra as Lakshmi Mahesh
 M. Monisha as Sarala
 Sairam as George
 P. S. Sabrish as Michael
 Janani Iyer as Background Model (cameo appearance)

Production 
Thiru Thiru Thuru Thuru is the first film produced by Sathyam Cinemas.

Soundtrack
The music composed by Mani Sharma.

References

2009 films
2000s Tamil-language films
Films scored by Mani Sharma
2009 directorial debut films